Scrivens is a surname, and may refer to:

 Ben Scrivens (born 1986), Canadian ice hockey goaltender.
 Brian Scrivens (born 1937), Welsh rugby union, and rugby league footballer of the 1950s and 1960s
 Jean Scrivens (born 1935), British track and field athlete.
 Steve Scrivens, English professional footballer.
 Tom Scrivens (1876 – after 1899), English professional footballer.

See also
 Scriven (surname)
 Scrivener